Shane Proctor (born March 24, 1985) is an American professional rodeo cowboy. He is the 2011 Professional Rodeo Cowboys Association (PRCA) world champion bull rider.

Early life 
Shane Proctor was born on March 24, 1985, in Grand Coulee, Washington.

Personal life 
He currently resides in Delaware, Oklahoma, with his wife Hayley, whom he married in 2019. In his previous marriage, he was married to two-time Professional Bull Riders (PBR) world champion J.B. Mauney's sister, Jessi.

Career 
Proctor competes in the Professional Rodeo Cowboys Association (PRCA) and Professional Bull Riders (PBR) circuits. He has also competed in the now-defunct Championship Bull Riding (CBR) tour. He is the 2011 PRCA world champion bull rider, and has qualified for the PRCA's National Finals Rodeo (NFR) six times (2011 to 2013, 2015 to 2016 and 2021) in bull riding and the PBR World Finals nine times (2006, 2008 to 2011, 2013, and 2015 to 2017). Apart from being a bull rider, he is also a bareback and saddle bronc rider.

Proctor made his debut on the PBR's elite series, the Built Ford Tough Series in 2006. In January 2010, at Madison Square Garden, in New York City, New York, Proctor rode 2008 and 2010 World Champion Bull Bones for 91.25 points. Bones scored 44.5 points, just an average score for a bull of his calibre. Proctor won the event that weekend. In April 2017, in an event in Tacoma, Washington, Proctor rode World Champion Bull Contender Pearl Harbor for 93.50 points. The bull scored 45.75, a very good score for a high calibre bull. The ride won him the 15/15 Bucking Battle. "Riding in my home state, it doesn’t get much better than that,” Proctor said. “Definitely probably the highlight of my career." In 2011, prior to winning the PRCA bull riding world championship, Proctor won the PRCA Xtreme Bulls tour championship as well as the PBR Touring Pro Division championship.

Proctor has qualified for the NFR five times. Four of those times he also had qualified for the PBR World Finals, including when he won the PRCA World Bull Riding Champion title. “That is one of the biggest things I take pride in,” Proctor said. "When it comes down to it, I was good in both associations, but I was never great. I would like to be a great cowboy. The guys I looked up to were Ty Murray and Cody Lambert. Guys that did the all-around."

On Friday, January 6, 2018, after completing his last PBR event at Madison Square Garden, Proctor announced his intention to leave the PBR in order to pursue an All-Around Cowboy title in the PRCA. Proctor had spent several years competing in both circuits, but was focusing solely on the PRCA as of January 2018. "Proctor has long been considered a better bronc rider than bull rider, but bull riding was something that Proctor knew would always pay the bills better for him": Since his PBR debut, he has earned $1.3 million. He almost won a couple years ago, but fell short by $400 in one event (you have to win at least $3,000 in two events).  He also felt it was time for another roughstock athlete to win the event. The last time was when Ty Murray won the title in 1998. Stetson Wright later won the first PRCA All-Around world title by a roughstock cowboy in 21 years in 2019. 

In the summer of 2020, Proctor accepted an invitation to compete in the PBR’s Monster Energy Team Challenge, a temporary series of events in which several teams of riders competed for a large amount of money. These events were held at the South Point Hotel Arena & Equestrian Center in Las Vegas, Nevada. No fans were allowed to attend due to the COVID-19 pandemic. However, the championship event at the Denny Sanford Premier Center in Sioux Falls, South Dakota did consist of a limited and socially distanced crowd.

In 2021, Proctor returned to riding in the PBR and won the Velocity Tour event in Pensacola, Florida in April. As a result, he was invited to compete at the Unleash the Beast Series event in Sioux Falls, South Dakota the next weekend where he bucked off all his bulls. Prior to the event in Sioux Falls, Proctor stated that he did not wish to compete full-time in the Unleash the Beast Series.

References

1985 births
Living people
People from Grant County, Washington
Bull riders
Bareback bronc riders
Saddle bronc riders
Sportspeople from Washington (state)
Sportspeople from North Carolina
People from Troutman, North Carolina